Sabato may refer to:

Sabato (surname)
Sabato (river), a river in southern Italy
Sabato (Tenchi Muyo!), a fictional character in the Tenchi Muyo! series
Sabato Morais (1823-1897), Italian-American rabbi
Instituto Sabato
Saturday, in Italian